Michael Dillon (born 29 September 1952) is a former professional footballer who played as a central defender for Tottenham Hotspur, Millwall, Swindon, Montreal Olympique, New York Cosmos, Washington Diplomats and represented England at schoolboy and youth level.

Playing career
Dillon joined Tottenham Hotspur as an apprentice in December 1969. He played 29 times in all competitions including three as a substitute and scored one goal between 1972 and 1974. The highlight of Dillon's career at Spurs was a substitute appearance in the First leg of the 1974 UEFA Cup Final against Feyenoord at White Hart Lane. In December 1974 he joined Millwall in a loan deal and went on to make four appearances for the club before joining Swindon Town on loan in March 1975 where he featured in nine matches including two as sub.

Dillon had three spells in the North American Soccer League (NASL). In 1972 with Montreal Olympique, between 1975 and 1977 he played for New York Cosmos (1970–85) alongside Pelé and Giorgio Chinaglia before ending his career at Washington Diplomats in 1978–79. 
During the autumn of 1977, Mike Dillon joined his brother Tommy at Isthmian League side Cheshunt on loan  where he faced former Spurs teammate Jimmy Greaves, then playing for Barnet during a Herts Senior Cup tie before returning to America.

Coaching career
Dillon was the head coach of Georgetown Hoyas soccer team.

After football
Today, Dillon owns a post office in the village of Moulton close to the Cambridgeshire–Suffolk border.

References

External links
Tottenham Hotspur F.C A-Z of players Retrieved 29 November 2012 
NASL Stats

Living people
1952 births
Association football defenders
English footballers
Footballers from Highgate
English Football League players
North American Soccer League (1968–1984) players
Millwall F.C. players
Montreal Olympique players
New York Cosmos players
Swindon Town F.C. players
Tottenham Hotspur F.C. players
Cheshunt F.C. players
Washington Diplomats (NASL) players
English football managers
Georgetown Hoyas men's soccer coaches
English expatriate footballers
English expatriate sportspeople in the United States
Expatriate soccer players in the United States
English expatriate sportspeople in Canada
Expatriate soccer players in Canada